Koba Gogoladze (born January 7, 1973 in Poti, Samegrelo-Zemo Svaneti) is a professional boxer from Georgia. He competed in the 1996 Summer Olympics as a lightweight, losing on points in the quarterfinals to Leonard Doroftei.

Olympic career

1996 Lightweight competitor at Olympic Games in Atlanta, United States. Results were:
 First Round — Defeated Ri Chol (North Korea), 17-9
 Second Round — Defeated Julio Gonzalez Valladares (Cuba), 14-9
 Quarter Finals — Lost to Leonard Doroftei (Romania), 8-17

Professional career
Gogoladze turned professional in 1999, boxing mainly in England, although he did also fight once in Cyprus (winning the minor World Boxing Federation (WBF) International Lightweight title) and twice in his native Georgia.  He took two years off, and moved to Philadelphia.  He faced stiffer competition in the US, recording his first loss against Almazbek Raiymkulov. After two more bouts, he faced Scotland's Alex Arthur for the interim WBO title where he was stopped by a 10th round TKO. A final loss, to Ji-Hoon Kim, this time a 1st round TKO, closed out his career.

References

External links
 
 sports-reference

1972 births
Living people
Olympic boxers of Georgia (country)
Boxers at the 1996 Summer Olympics
Male boxers from Georgia (country)
AIBA World Boxing Championships medalists
Lightweight boxers
20th-century people from Georgia (country)